Conaco, LLC is the television production firm owned by entertainer Conan O'Brien. The name is a portmanteau of the words "Conan" and "Co", an abbreviation of company. It has produced programs primarily for NBCUniversal and Warner Bros. Discovery, including O'Brien's Late Night, Tonight Show, and Conan. David Kissinger, former NBCU executive and the son of Henry Kissinger, has been president since 2005.

Conaco's first production credit was the short-lived 2001 reality show Lost. The firm also produced the Andy Richter series Andy Barker, P.I. for six episodes as well as the drama Outlaw, about a former Supreme Court justice (Jimmy Smits) who starts a law firm, which was canceled after a few episodes.

O'Brien's departure agreement with NBC following the 2010 Tonight Show conflict allowed Conaco to continue operation until the end of the production season. After that, Conaco switched affiliations to Warner Bros. Television, owned by Time Warner along with O'Brien's new network beginning in November 2010, TBS. Conaco produced O'Brien's late night talk show on TBS. Conaco also produced Eagleheart, a show starring Chris Elliott for TBS' sister network, Adult Swim.

Productions

Current productions
Untitled HBO Max stand-up specials

Past productions
 Late Night with Conan O'Brien (2001–2009)
 Lost (2001)
 Andy Barker, P.I. (2007)
 The Tonight Show with Conan O'Brien (2009–2010)
 Outlaw (2010)
 Conan (2010–2021)
 Eagleheart (2011–2014)
 Deon Cole's Black Box (2013)
 Super Fun Night (2013–2014)
 The Pete Holmes Show (2013–2014)
 People of Earth (2016–2017)
 Don't Hug Me I'm Scared (2018) (TV pilot)
 Final Space (2018–2021)

References

External links
 TeamCoco.com: Official website for Conan O'Brien

NBCUniversal
Television production companies of the United States
Conan O'Brien
Mass media companies established in 2001